The Royal Museums of Art and History or RMAH is a group of museums in Brussels, Belgium. It is part of the Belgian federal institute of the Belgian Federal Science Policy Office (BELSPO) and consists of five museums: the Art & History Museum (formerly the Cinquantenaire Museum), the  Horta-Lambeaux Pavilion, the Halle Gate, the Museums of the Far East and the Musical Instrument Museum (MIM).

History

The Origins of the Cinquantenaire Museum
From the 15th to the 17th century, diplomatic gifts, mementoes and curiosa owned by the Dukes of Burgundy and subsequently the Habsburg archdukes were displayed in the Royal Arsenal, a large hall in the vicinity of the Palace of Coudenberg. It was there that the first collections, which are now housed in the Royal Museums of Art and History, were established. Regrettably, a large number of art treasures and objects were removed to the imperial museums in Vienna in 1794. The collections were moved to the Palais de l’Industrie, the left wing of the present Royal Museums of Fine Art.

From the Halle Gate to the Cinquantenaire Palace

The first head curator was Antoine-Guillaume-Bernard Scheyes and the collections expanded rapidly, thanks to important bequests from such persons as Gustave Hegemans (1861) and Emile de Meester de Ravestein (1874).

When the Halle Gate became too small to hold the continually expanding number of items, the decision was taken to split the collections, and in 1889, under the new head curator, Eugène Van Overloop, the objects from classical antiquity were moved to the Cinquantenaire Palace, which had been built on the initiative of King Leopold II. In 1906, the ethnographic collection was likewise transferred there, the collection of arms and armour remaining at the Halle Gate.

The new museum complex at the Cinquantenaire was named the Royal Museums of Decorative and Industrial Art. That name was changed in 1912 to the Royal Museums of the Cinquantenaire, but, to prevent confusion, had to be changed yet again when the Museum of the Armed Forces and Military History was also established at the Cinquantenaire in 1922. The institution became the Royal Museums of Art and History, a name that was officially confirmed in 1926, and which has remained unchanged to the present day. In 1925, Eugène Van Overloop was succeeded by the Egyptologist Jean Capart, during whose term of office the museums became a leading scientific institution. Indeed, the interwar period proved to be an auspicious period for them: the collections of the Cinquantenaire Museum were expanded, funds increased and various research centres were set up; in addition, various scientific expeditions were organised, one of them to Easter Island in 1936.

The Cinquantenaire Museum after the Second World War

The Second World War brought a sharp halt to the activities of the RMAH. The collections were taken to safety and, in 1942, Henry Lavachery took over from Jean Capart. Immediately after the war, he began a thorough reorganisation of the institution. In 1946, a fierce fire reduced an entire wing of the Cinquantenaire Museum to ashes, as well as destroying part of the collections housed there.

Rebuilding took time and it was only in 1966 that the new wing was inaugurated. The work was expertly led by Count Charles de Borchgrave d’Altena, head curator from 1951 to 1963, and by his immediate successor Pierre Gilbert. All the while, they were expanding the collections (with, among other things, the series of tapestries The History of Jacob) and modernising the museum. Their successors as head curator have continued the work of reorganisation and renovation and since the mid-1980s have seen some eighty big, temporary exhibitions organised, adding to the institution’s dynamism.

See also

 Centre for Fine Arts
 Royal Museums of Fine Arts of Belgium
 History of Brussels
 Culture of Belgium
 Belgium in "the long nineteenth century"

References

Further reading

External links
 

Museums in Brussels
Art museums and galleries in Belgium
History museums in Belgium
Museum associations and consortia
Organisations based in Belgium with royal patronage